The Solution is the third collaborative studio album by American rapper Buckshot and record producer 9th Wonder. It was released on November 13, 2012 through Jamla Records/Duck Down Music. Production was entirely handled by 9th Wonder, who also served as executive producer. It features guest appearances from Dyme-A-Duzin and Rapsody. The album debuted at number 196 on the Billboard 200 chart, with first-week sales of 2,300 copies in the United States.

A music video for the album's lead single "The Change Up" was directed by Kenneth Price. Another video was released for the song "Shorty Left".

Critical reception 

The Solution was met with generally favorable reviews. At Metacritic, which assigns a normalized rating out of 100 to reviews from mainstream publications, the album received an average score of 73, based on seven reviews.

Bogar Alonso of XXL stated, "The Solution finds Buckshot doing a better job than in his past two at-bats to keep up with the super producer, and he does so by using his relaxed spitting as an anchor". AllMusic's David Jeffries said, "The nostalgia and artistry will take you back and warm your Coogi-covered heart". Ryan B. Patrick of Exclaim! said, "It's a gritty, soulful sound that holds The Solution together, seemingly aspiring to be nothing more than "Boot Camp meets Little Brother": familiar and stress-free for an audience seeking a vintage feel in their hip-hop". Jesse Fairfax of HipHopDX said, "The Solution once again combines Buckshot and 9th Wonder's accomplished and refined skill sets as pioneers of the '90s and the past decade respectively". Grant Jones of RapReviews said, "The Solution doesn't differ from the previous instalments at all. If you're a fan of either artist then it is certainly worth picking up". Jon Hadusek of Consequence of Sound said, "Although The Solution is too hung up on the past to be relevant in the present, it remains a competent throwback to hip-hop's golden age, an era that both artists seem to be yearning for. That nostalgia pervades The Solution".

Track listing
All Tracks Produced by Patrick "9th Wonder" Douthit

Sample Credits
"The Big Bang"
"Come Fly Away with Me" by Magnum Force
"What I Gotta Say"
"New Directions" by The Foundations
"Crazy"
"I Don’t See Me...Anymore" by Glass House
"The Feeling"
"Let the Feeling Talk to You" by The Dells
"Sam"
"Where Do We Go from Here / Journey" by Enchantment
"Pat Em Down"
"Tear Down The Walls" by Lamont Dozier
"Keep It Going"
"Break Down for Love" by Tavares
"The Change Up"
"Love is Just a Dream" by Cliff Dawson
"Shorty Left"
"All I Need is Time" by First Choice
"You"
"I Don’t Know" by The Controllers
"The Solution"
"Which One Should I Choose" by The Unifics

Personnel
 Kenyatta "Buckshot" Blake – main artist, associate executive producer
 Patrick "9th Wonder" Douthit – main artist, producer, executive producer
 Marlanna "Rapsody" Evans – vocals (track 10)
 Donnovan "Dyme-A-Duzin" Blocker – vocals (track 11)
 "Dan The Man" Humiston – mixing
 Isaac Romero – mastering
 Drew "Dru-Ha" Friedman – associate executive producer
 Jacqueline Shao – artwork
 Robert Adam Mayer – photography

Charts

References

External links

2012 albums
9th Wonder albums
Duck Down Music albums
Buckshot (rapper) albums
Albums produced by 9th Wonder